General San Martín is a station on Line C of the Buenos Aires Underground. The station is close to the San Martín Plaza, Kavanagh Building and the Plaza Hotel. The station was opened on 17 August 1937 when the extension of the line from Diagonal Norte to Retiro has already been in operation.

Gallery

References

External links

Buenos Aires Underground stations
Railway stations opened in 1937
1937 establishments in Argentina